Baymargh (also Romanized as Bāymargh; also known as Bei Mār, Bīmār, and Pāymorgh) is a village in Zohan Rural District, Zohan District, Zirkuh County, South Khorasan Province, Iran. At the 2006 census, its population was 301, in 83 families.

References 

Populated places in Zirkuh County